Osachila is a genus of crabs in the family Aethridae, containing three fossil species, and the following extant species:
 Osachila acuta Stimpson, 1871
 Osachila antillensis Rathbun, 1916
 Osachila expansa Takeda, 1977
 Osachila galapagensis Rathbun, 1935
 Osachila kaiserae Zimmerman & Martin, 1999
 Osachila lata Faxon, 1893
 Osachila levis Rathbun, 1898
 Osachila semilevis Rathbun, 1916
 Osachila sona Garth, 1940
 Osachila stimpsonii Studer, 1883
 Osachila tuberosa Stimpson, 1871

References

Crabs